Gustavo Martín Fernández (born August 4, 1990 in Entre Rios) is an Argentinian football forward for Deportivo Riestra.

References

External links

1990 births
Living people
Sportspeople from Entre Ríos Province
Argentine footballers
Argentine expatriate footballers
Club Atlético River Plate footballers
Instituto footballers
Deportivo Saprissa players
Deportivo Laferrere footballers
Defensores de Belgrano footballers
Magallanes footballers
Club Blooming players
Deportivo Riestra players
Argentine Primera División players
Primera Nacional players
Liga FPD players
Primera B de Chile players
Argentine expatriate sportspeople in Chile
Argentine expatriate sportspeople in Uruguay
Argentine expatriate sportspeople in Costa Rica
Argentine expatriate sportspeople in Bolivia
Expatriate footballers in Chile
Expatriate footballers in Uruguay
Expatriate footballers in Costa Rica
Expatriate footballers in Bolivia
Association football forwards